Shinka is a small village near Jalalia village in Chach Valley of Attock District in Punjab province of Pakistan.

The nearby villages to Shinka are  Behbudi, Ghorghushti, Malak Mala and Nartopa. This Area is considered to be arable land and good soil for farming.

References

Villages in Attock District